Ilyino is a village in Torzhoksky District of Tver Oblast, Russia.

References

Rural localities in Torzhoksky District